Olesin may refer to the following places:
Olesin, Krasnystaw County in Lublin Voivodeship (east Poland)
Olesin, Puławy County in Lublin Voivodeship (east Poland)
Olesin, Masovian Voivodeship (east-central Poland)
Olesin, Konin County in Greater Poland Voivodeship (west-central Poland)
Olesin, Szamotuły County in Greater Poland Voivodeship (west-central Poland)
Olesin, Turek County in Greater Poland Voivodeship (west-central Poland)